Now That I Found You may refer to:

"Now That I Found You" (Terri Clark song), a 1998 song by Terri Clark
"Now That I Found You", a 1999 song by Mytown
"Now That I Found You", a 2013 song by Britney Spears from her album Britney Jean
"Now That I Found You" (Carly Rae Jepsen song), a 2019 song by Carly Rae Jepsen

See also
"Baby Now That I've Found You", a 1967 song by The Foundations
"Now That I've Found You", a 2016 song by Martin Garrix